The KS-23 is a Soviet shotgun, although because it uses a rifled barrel it is officially designated by the Russian military as a carbine. KS stands for Karabin Spetsialniy, "Special Carbine". It is renowned for its large caliber, firing a 23 mm round, equating to 6.27 gauge using the British and American standards of shotgun gauges and approximately 4 gauge using the current European standards (based on the metric CIP tables), making it the largest-bore shotgun in use today.

History
The KS-23 was designed in the 1970s for suppressing prison riots. It was created by TsNIITochMash, a key Soviet weapons developer, for the Ministry of Internal Affairs (MVD). The barrel for the KS-23 were made from 23 mm aircraft gun barrels that were rejected due to manufacturing flaws. These rejected barrels were deemed to be acceptable for the lower stress of firing slugs and less-lethal rounds, and thus were cut down in length for use as shotgun barrels.
The KS-23 began to see use during the mid-1980s by several MVD forces. During the 1990s, research was made into improving the original design to make it usable in confined indoor areas. Two prototypes were proposed, the KS-23M and KS-23K, although only the M version saw use.

Ammunition
The KS-23 was created with the capability to fire several different types of ammunition, listed below:
 "Shrapnel-10" («Шрапнель-10»): buckshot round with 10-meter effective range
 "Shrapnel-25" («Шрапнель-25»): buckshot round with 25-meter effective range
 "Barrikada" («Баррикада», "Barricade"): cartridge with solid steel projectile able to destroy the engine block of a car at up to 100 meters
 "Volna" («Волна», "Wave"): inert version of cartridge used for education and practice during training
 "Volna-R" («Волна-Р», "Wave"): cartridge with less-lethal rubber bullet
 "Strela-3" («Стрела-3», "Arrow"): cartridge with less-lethal plastic bullet
 "Cheremukha-7" («Черёмуха-7», "Bird Cherry"-7): tear gas grenade with CN agent
 "Siren'-7" («Сирень-7», "Lilac"): tear gas grenade with CS agent
 "Zvezda" («Звезда», "Star"): flash-bang round
 PV-23 (ПВ-23): blank (grenade launching) cartridge

Later, two add-on muzzle mortars were produced, the 36 mm Nasadka-6 and 82 mm Nasadka-12, bringing with them several new ammunition types:

 Blank grenade launching cartridge to be used with muzzle mortars
 36 mm "Cheremukha-6" tear gas grenade
 82 mm "Cheremukha-12" "high-efficiency" tear gas grenade for use on open areas

Variants

KS-23
The original KS-23 was developed jointly by NIISpetstekhniki (MVD) and TsNIITochmash in 1971, it was accepted for use by the Soviet police in 1985. The gun has a barrel length of 510 mm and an overall length of 1040 mm. The KS-23 has an underbarrel tubular magazine capable of holding three rounds, with one in the chamber giving the gun a maximum round capacity of four. The gun's effective range is 150 m.

KS-23-1
It is a short barrel version of KS-23.

KS-23M
The KS-23M «дрозд» (Carbine, Special, 23 mm, modernized - project: Drozd > "Thrush") was developed on the base of the KS-23. Development for it was started in October 1990. Twenty-five carbines were submitted for testing on December 10, 1991. After which the winner, then designated S-3, became the KS-23M "Thrush" and was accepted for use by the police and the Internal Troops of Russia. The KS-23M includes a detachable wire buttstock and shortened barrel, as opposed to the fixed wooden stock on standard KS-23s. The gun is still chambered in 23 mm. Its overall length with the buttstock is 875 mm, without, 650 mm, and the barrel is 410 mm long. The gun's effective range is 150 m.

KS-23K
The KS-23K is a redesigned KS-23 that features a bullpup layout. The KS-23K was accepted in 1998 for the use of the Russian Ministry of Internal Affairs (MVD). Development and adoption of this carbine was motivated by the fact that in the earlier accepted configurations of the KS-23 and KS-23M a major noted deficiency was that the tubular magazine did not make it possible to rapidly reload or change the type of ammunition being used, because of this a major design change for the KS-23K is that it has an extended box magazine that holds seven shells instead of the three shells seen on the other models. The gun has a mechanical safety located on the left side, above the pistol handle and open non adjustable sights. The gun's effective range is 100 m.

TOZ-123
The civilian version of the KS-23 is the ТОZ-123 "Drake-4" (ТОЗ-123 «Селезень-4»). It is manufactured by Tulsky Oruzheiny Zavod and features a smoothbore design, making it more similar to a traditional shotgun, and is chambered in standard 4-gauge. The first shotgun was made in 1995. It has been legal to use as a civilian hunting shotgun in Russia since August 1996.

The gun maker's website has this as the description for the shotgun.

The shotgun is multicharged, with a tubular underbarrel magazine of 3-cartridge capacity. Reloading is provided with a removable fore-end. The presence of the special barrel rear projection on the frame combined with the rear sight gives the possibility of mounting an optical sight. The shotgun is intended for the amateur hunting with shot cartridges.

The TOZ-123 was banned from import into the United States during the Clinton administration.

Users
 :
 : prison guards
 
 : Border Guard Service
 
 : customs service

See also
 List of Russian weaponry
 Zlatoust RB-12

References

Further reading 
 Игорь Скрылев. КС-23 - наш полицейский карабин // журнал "Мастер-ружьё", № 1, 1997. стр.48-51 
 Карабины КС-23, КС-23М "Дрозд" // А. И. Благовестов. То, из чего стреляют в СНГ: Справочник стрелкового оружия. / под общ.ред. А. Е. Тараса. Минск, «Харвест», 2000. стр.420-424

External links

 Modern Firearms: KS-23 riot shotgun / carbine
 Security Arms: KS-23 Shotgun
 Tulsky Oruzheiny Zavod: TOZ-123

Carbines
Pump-action shotguns
Riot guns
Teargas grenade guns
Rifles of the Soviet Union
Shotguns of Russia
Cold War firearms of the Soviet Union
Tula Arms Plant products
TsNIITochMash products